Oshakati Senior Secondary School is a school in Oshakati, Iipumbu yaShilongo street, in Oshana Region, northern Namibia.  It was established in 1973 and has 34 classes. The principal is Mr. Kamati.

See also
 List of schools in Namibia
 Education in Namibia

Boarding schools in Namibia
Educational institutions established in 1973
Oshakati
1973 establishments in South West Africa